Sarah Jane Olney ( McGibbon; born 11 January 1977) is a British Liberal Democrat politician and former accountant who has served as Member of Parliament (MP) for Richmond Park since 2019, and previously from 2016 to 2017. Olney has served as the Liberal Democrat Spokesperson for Treasury since July 2022, and for Business and Industrial Strategy since January 2020.

She was the constituency's MP for six months, from a by-election in December 2016 to the general election in June 2017, and then two years later, she regained the seat at the 2019 general election, facing off against Zac Goldsmith of the Conservative Party in all three elections.  She was the Liberal Democrat Spokesperson for International Trade from January 2020 to September 2020, and was Spokesperson for Education from May 2017 to June 2017. Whilst out of Parliament, she was a financial accountant for Historic Royal Palaces, from 2018 to 2019.

Early life and career
Olney was born in Frimley, Surrey in 1977 to parents Ian McGibbon and Rosalyn McGibbon. She was educated at All Hallows Catholic School in Farnham and then studied English Literature and Language at King's College London. She initially worked as a bookseller in Hatchards, Piccadilly, from 1998 to 2000.

Olney became a qualified accountant at the Association of Chartered Certified Accountants in 2016. She worked as an accountant at Barclays, Arts & Business, Distilled Ltd, SCi Sales Group and the National Physical Laboratory in Teddington until she entered politics after the 2015 general election.

Political career
Olney joined the Liberal Democrats in July 2015, soon after the general election, in the realisation that she was a liberal dissatisfied with the direction of the United Kingdom.

On 25 October 2016, Conservative MP Zac Goldsmith announced his resignation from the House of Commons over his objection to his party's support for a third runway at Heathrow Airport, triggering a by-election in his seat of Richmond Park. Goldsmith stood in the by-election as an independent candidate although he remained a Conservative party member with the support of Nigel Farage's UKIP, who along with the Conservative party, did not put forward a candidate. On 30 October 2016, Olney was announced as the Liberal Democrats' candidate for the by-election.

On 1 December 2016, after overturning a majority of over 23,000 votes, Olney was elected as the Member of Parliament (MP) for Richmond Park. She received 20,510 votes (49.6% of total votes), giving her a majority of 1,872 votes (4.5%). She was the only female Liberal Democrat MP in the 2015–2017 parliament. Shortly after her election, Olney ended a radio interview in which she was pressed on her support for a second Brexit referendum. Supporting a second referendum became official Liberal Democrat policy shortly afterwards.

In the run-up to the 2017 general election, Olney was recorded urging Liberal Democrats to vote for Labour MPs in seats where Labour candidates stood a better chance of defeating Conservatives, rather than Liberal Democrat candidates. Olney referred to the Liberal Democrat candidate for Ealing Central and Acton as a "paper candidate" and voiced her support for the incumbent Labour Party MP Rupa Huq. It was reported by the Evening Standard in April 2018 that Olney had been interviewed under caution by the police for allegedly breaking official spending limits in the Richmond Park by-election. The Crown Prosecution Service ruled that there was no evidence, and closed the case.

At the 2017 general election, Olney lost the seat she gained just months earlier to Goldsmith, who stood as the Conservative candidate, polling 45.07% of the vote to Goldsmith's 45.14%, giving Goldsmith a narrow majority of just 45 votes.

On 9 September 2017, it was announced that she would be taking up the post of chief of staff for Liberal Democrat leader Sir Vince Cable.

In 2019, she was officially confirmed as the Liberal Democrat candidate for Richmond Park at the next general election. She regained the seat with a 6% swing to her party and a majority of 7,766 votes, attaining a 53.1% share of the vote.

Views
On the topic of Brexit, Olney voted against the triggering of Article 50, as she had indicated during the by-election campaign that she would do so. She believed that another referendum should have been held once the exact terms of Britain's exit from the EU had been announced. While being interviewed by Julia Hartley-Brewer of talkRADIO, Olney could not defend her party's position on holding a second referendum, and she hung up the call, with a staff member claiming that Olney had another interview scheduled. Olney opposes the building of a third runway at Heathrow Airport.

In May 2021, alongside celebrities and other public figures, Olney was a signatory to an open letter from Stylist magazine which called on the government to address what it described as an "epidemic of male violence" by funding an "ongoing, high-profile, expert-informed awareness campaign on men's violence against women and girls".

Personal life
In 2002, she married Benjamin (Ben) James Olney, a town planner. The couple have a son and a daughter. They have also had another son, who is deceased.

See also
 Timeline of Female MPs in the House of Commons of the United Kingdom

References

External links

 
 Richmond Park Liberal Democrats
Appearances on C-SPAN

1977 births
Living people
Alumni of King's College London
British accountants
Liberal Democrats (UK) MPs for English constituencies
Female members of the Parliament of the United Kingdom for English constituencies
21st-century British women politicians
UK MPs 2015–2017
UK MPs 2019–present
21st-century English women
21st-century English people